O'Neal Ridge is a high ridge trending NE-SW, bounded by Ingham Glacier and Humphries Glacier in the Victory Mountains of Victoria Land. Named by Advisory Committee on Antarctic Names (US-ACAN) for Russell D. O'Neal, member of the National Science Board, 1972–77. As part of his official duties in support of the U.S. science program, he visited several sites in Antarctica in 1975.

Ridges of Victoria Land
Borchgrevink Coast